The 2007 Lunar New Year Cup (formerly known as the Carlsberg Cup) was a football tournament held in Hong Kong on the first and fourth day of the Chinese New Year of the Pig (19 January and 22 January 2007).

Participating teams
 China Olympic Team
 Australia Olympic Team
 Hong Kong League XI
 Jamaica Olympic Team

Squads

Australia Olympic Team

The Australian squad was as follows.
Head coach: Rob Baan
Assistant coach: Graham Arnold
Goalkeeper coach: Tony Franken
Team manager: Gary Moretti
Doctor: Marc Cesana
Equipment Manager: Dominic Rabsch
Physiotherapist: Philip Coles
Conditioner / Masseur: Paul Scott

China Olympic Team

The Chinese squad was as follows.
 H.O.D.: Nan Yong
 Head coach: Ratomir Dujković
 Assistant coach: Aleksandar Tomic, Su Maozhen
 Goalkeeper coach: Stevan Mićić
 Team manager: Li Xiaoguang
 Administrator: Guo Bingyan, Hu Ping
 Coach: Jia Xiuquan
 Doctor: Zhang Peng, Yan Cheng

Hong Kong League XI

The Hong Kong squad was as follows.
 Team manager: Steven Lo Kit Shing, Raymond Chow Man Leung
 Manager Assistant: Lee Yuen Wah
 Co-Ordinator: Tsang Wai Chung
 Coach: Casemiro Mior
 Assistant coach: Dejan Antonić

Note: * Ivan Jević replaced Jaimes Mckee of HKFC who withdrew from the squad due to injury.

Jamaica Olympic Team
The Jamaican squad was a follows.
H.O.D.: Linnel Mclean	
Technical director: Bora Milutinovic 	
Coach: Wendell Downswell  		
Team manager: Howard Bell
Equipment Steward: Manley Burrowes
Team doctor: Dr. Mark Sanderson

Results
All times given in Hong Kong Time (UTC+8).

Semi-finals

Third place match

Final

Bracket

Top scorers
2 goals
  Keith Gumbs

1 goal
  Bruce Djite
  Fabian Taylor
  Festus Baise
  Jiang Ning
  Nathan Burns

See also
 Hong Kong Football Association
 Hong Kong First Division League

References

External links
 2007 Lunar New Year Cup, HKFA Website
 News, HKFA Website

2007
2006–07 in Hong Kong football
2007 in Australian soccer
2007 in Chinese football
2007 in Jamaican sport